Törr is a Czech metal band founded in Prague in 1977. They are considered one of the first Czech black metal bands. To date, they have released ten studio albums, two live albums, and two compilations.

History

Early years: 1977–1986
Törr, named after the unit of pressure, was formed in 1977 by vocalist and guitarist Ota Hereš and drummer Pavel Kadeřábek, though the original spelling of their name lacked the metal umlaut it sports today. The band began by playing heavy metal, and a year later, they were joined by bass player Filip Moldan. Michael Jakubův soon replaced Kadeřábek on drums and in 1980, they added a second guitarist, Jiří Podzimek, becoming a foursome. Podzimek left a year later, however, and the band returned to playing as a trio until 1983, when David Strnad took on second guitar duties. Around this time, following Motörhead's example, the band added the metal umlaut to their name. In the summer of 1984, David Strnad was replaced by Miroslav Mach and a year later, Bogan Chadt took over on vocal duties. Several more lineup changes took place and in 1986, the band broke up due to other commitments.

666 and demo albums: 1986–1989
In 1986, bassist Vlasta Henych and Törr founder Ota Hereš decided to form the band 666 together with drummer Pavel Konvalinka. Later that year, Milan Háva, who had previously played with Törr, took over on drums, and the trio switched to playing black metal under their old name. At this time, Henych and Hereš shared vocal duties. The band released their first demo tape in 1987, titled Witchhammer. In 1988, due to negative publicity relating to their stage shows, the group was banned from performing by the Czechoslovak government. This situation lasted until 1989, when the band released their second demo, the live recording Törr Gang Live '89. The same year, Hereš had to leave the band in order to perform his mandatory military service. Törr released one more demo that year, titled Masturbace mozku, which included guest vocals by Arakain singer Aleš Brichta.

First three albums and Zemětřesení: 1990–1993
In 1990 Törr, then consisting of Henych on bass and vocals, Daniel "Šakal" Švarc on guitar and vocals, and Martin "Melmus" Melmuka on drums, released their debut album, titled Armageddon, which went on to sell over 60,000 copies. The record also included a contribution from Ota Balage on keyboards. The same year, the band was joined by second guitarist, Pavel "Monroe" Kohout, who also contributed additional vocals.
In 1991, Törr followed their successful debut with the album Institut klinické smrti, which shocked audiences with cover art depicting a flayed Jesus Christ on a cross.
After Kohout's departure in 1992, the band, once more a trio, released their third album, Chcípni o kus dál, which bore a mixed sound, less the pure black metal of their previous efforts.

In 1992, Vlasta Henych won the Černá vrána rock/metal poll as best bassist. The poll was intended to put together a group which would bring to life the music of Jiří Schelinger, who had died in 1981. The supergroup, which also included vocalist Aleš Brichta, guitarist Miloš "Dodo" Doležal, and drummer Štěpán Smetáček, was called Zemětřesení, and they released a self-titled album in 1993.

Back to classics; hiatus: 1993–1995
In 1993, a long-planned return to the band's original lineup was accomplished, with Ota Hereš on guitar and vocals, Vlasta Henych on bass and vocals, and Milan Háva on drums. From this emerged the retrospective album Kladivo na čarodějnice 1986–1989, consisting of re-recorded selections of Törr's early material, considered to be their most iconic work. The record also included contributions from Martin Melmuka and Pavel Kohout. Following the release, the band went on indefinite hiatus.

Masked return and change of sound: 1995–1999
In 1995, after two years of inactivity, Henych revived the group in a new lineup, whose members were initially kept secret as the trio wore balaclavas while performing. The two new members were later revealed to be Roman "Izzi" Izaiáš on guitar and vocals, and Petr Vajda on drums. They released their next album, Morituri te salutant, in 1996, all the while performing in disguise, an image they presented even on the album cover. The musical sound of the new record was a major departure for Törr: leaving their former black metal sound behind, they switched to a more traditional hard rock sound, and this drove away many of their previous fans.
In 1996, the band released their first concert album, simply titled Live. Composed of eleven tracks, the recording also includes one of Jiří Schelinger's biggest hits, the song "Lupič Willy", which had been recorded by the Zemětřesení project in 1993. The band continued to tour but didn't make any new releases until 1999, when they issued the double disc Gallery, which included remastered versions of their four earliest albums.

New material and departure of Henych: 2000–2010
2000 saw the release of the first new album from Törr since 1996. Titled Tanec svatýho Víta, it was another major musical departure for the band, who experimented with electronic sounds, moving away from their metal/rock legacy. This caused another exodus of fans, and the album performed poorly. Three years later, Törr went through another transformation. Founding member Ota Hereš rejoined after fourteen years, and the band decided to return to the genre that brought them the most fame, black metal. Radek Sladký joined on drums, and the trio released the album Made in Hell in the fall of 2003. Guest musicians included Big Boss and Miloš "Dodo" Doležal, and the album contained two covers: "Countess Bathory" by Venom and "Sympathy for the Devil" by The Rolling Stones.
The next few years proved busy for the band. In 2006, they released new material with Törritorium and a triple-CD rarities collection titled Inkubátörr; in 2007 a reissue of their first demo, Witchhammer; and in 2010, the live album Inferno Nocturno. At the end of the decade, Henych left Törr due to artistic differences, however, ending another significant era for the band. He went on to start his own group, under the title Henych 666.

New lineup and new material: 2010–present
Törr returned with a new lineup later in 2010, though more changes took place before they stabilized again, with new bassist Jan "Bart" Bartoš. Their next album, titled Tempus Fugit, was released in the fall of 2011. The band's second demo, Törr Gang Live, was reissued in 2015. Seeking a bigger sound for their future material, the band hired second guitarist Radek "Reddy" Kroc (Kreyson, Vitacit). He toured with the band throughout 2015, but left the following year, before the release of Törr's tenth studio album, Black 'n' Roll.

Band members
Current
 Ota Hereš – guitar, vocals
 Radek Sladký – drums
 Jan "Bart" Bartoš – bass

Past
 Pavel Kadeřábek – drums
 Filip Moldan – bass
 Michael Jakubův – drums
 Jiří Podzimek – guitar
 David Strnad – guitar
 Miroslav Mach – guitar
 Bogan Chadt – vocals
 Jiří Sochan – drums
 Jiří Rogl – drums
 Libor Remta – drums
 Milan Háva – drums
 Vlasta Henych – bass, vocals
 Daniel Šakal Švarc – guitar, vocals
 Martin "Melmus" Melmuka – drums
 Pavel "Monroe" Kohout – guitar, vocals
 Roman "Izzi" Izaiáš – guitar, vocals
 Petr Vajda – drums
 Josef Cigánek – drums
 Marek Žežulka – drums
 David Hradílek – bass, vocals
 Tomáš Eisler – guitar, vocals
 Radek "Reddy" Kroc – guitar

Discography

Demos
 Witchhammer (1987) 
 Törr Gang Live (1989) 
 Masturbace mozku (1989)

Studio albums
 Armageddon (1990)
 Institut klinické smrti (1991)
 Chcípni o kus dál (1992)
 Kladivo na čarodějnice 1986–1989 (1993)
 Morituri te salutant (1996)
 Tanec svatýho Víta (2000)
 Made in Hell (2003)
 Törritorium (2006)
 Tempus Fugit (2011)
 Black 'n' Roll (2016)

Live albums
 Live (1997)
 Inferno Nocturno (2010)

Compilations
 Gallery (1999)
 Inkubátörr (2006)

References

External links
 

Czech black metal musical groups
Czech thrash metal musical groups
Musical groups established in 1977
Czech heavy metal musical groups
Czech rock music groups
Musical groups from Prague
1977 establishments in Czechoslovakia